Wahyudi Setiawan Hamisi (born 28 July 1997), is an Indonesian professional footballer who plays as a defensive midfielder for Liga 1 club Borneo.

Club career

Borneo
He was signed for Borneo to play in Liga 1 for the 2017 season. Hamisi made his first-team debut on 29 April 2017 in a match against Persegres Gresik United. On 6 August 2018, Hamisi scored his first goal for Borneo against Mitra Kukar in the 8th minute at the Batakan Stadium, Balikpapan.

Career statistics

Club

References

External links
 Wahyudi Hamisi at Soccerway
 Wahyudi Hamisi at Liga Indonesia

1997 births
Living people
People from Kotamobagu
Indonesian footballers
Association football midfielders
Liga 1 (Indonesia) players
Borneo F.C. players
Sportspeople from North Sulawesi